MTS, Mts or mts may refer to:

Organizations
 Machine and tractor station, Soviet state-owned enterprise
 Manitoba Teachers' Society, Canada, founded 1919
 Marine Technology Society, professional society
 Marine Transportation Services, northern Canadian shipping company
 Merchant Taylors' School (disambiguation), several schools
 Metcash (stock exchange code), Australian distribution  company
 Metro Transport Sydney,  Australia, former Sydney light rail and monorail owner until 2013
 Metro Trains Sydney, Australia, operator of the Sydney Metro Northwest line since 2019
 Millennium Transit Services, a 2003–2009 US bus builder
 Mitchelton–Scott, a professional cycling team that competes on the UCI World Tour
 MTS Systems Corporation, test system supplier
 Muckleshoot Tribal Schools
 San Diego Metropolitan Transit System, since 1886

Telecommunications
 Bell MTS, a telecommunications provider in Manitoba, Canada formerly known as Manitoba Telephone System and Manitoba Telecom Services
 Mts (Telekom Srbija), a telecommunications company in Serbia
 MTS (network provider), a Russian telecommunications company
 MTS India, Indian subsidiary of MTS
 MTS Ukraine, former name of Vodafone Ukraine, a Ukrainian subsidiary of MTS
 MTS Turkmenistan

Science and technology
 Metre–tonne–second system of units, a system of physical units
 Metrical task system, mathematical objects used in the context of online algorithms
 MIDI Tuning Standard, a specification of precise musical pitch
 Mobile Telephone Service, early mobile telephone standard
 Movement Tracking System, US battlefield asset-tracking system
 Multichannel television sound, encoding several sound channels onto a single carrier

Computing
 .mts, file format for multiplexed audio, video and other streams
 Michigan Terminal System, a mainframe operating system
 Microsoft Transaction Server, software
 MT/s, megatransfers per second
 MPEG transport stream, a digital media container format

Biology and medicine
 Malaysian trumpet snail
 Mesial temporal sclerosis, pattern of hippocampal neuron cell loss
 Mohr–Tranebjærg syndrome, also known as deafness–dystonia syndrome
 MTS assay, a biochemical cell assay used in research
 Muir–Torre syndrome, a cancer syndrome

Other uses
 Make to stock, build-ahead production approach
 Master of Theological Studies, a graduate degree
 Matsapha Airport (IATA code MTS), a former airport in Eswatini
 Moored training ship, a United States Navy Nuclear Power School training ship
 Megan Thee Stallion, is an American rapper, singer, and songwriter
 MTS (group), a Canadian Eurodance band

See also
 MTSS (disambiguation)